Plicatula is a genus of saltwater clams, marine bivalve molluscs, known commonly as kitten's paws or kittenpaws in the family Plicatulidae.

Species
 Plicatula angolensis Cosel, 1995
 Plicatula anomioides Keen, 1958
 Plicatula australis Lamarck, 1819
 Plicatula ceylanica G. B. Sowerby II, 1873
 Plicatula complanata Deshayes, 1863
 Plicatula dubia G. B. Sowerby II, 1847
 Plicatula gibbosa Lamarck, 1801
 Plicatula horrida Dunker, 1882
 † Plicatula hunterae Shaak and Nicol, 1974
 † Plicatula megaera (d'Orbigny, 1850) 
 Plicatula miskito Petuch, 1998
 Plicatula muricata G. B. Sowerby II, 1873
 Plicatula novaezelandiae G. B. Sowerby II, 1873
 Plicatula penicillata Carpenter, 1857
 Plicatula pernula Melvill, 1898
 Plicatula plicata (Linnaeus, 1764)
 Plicatula regularis Philippi, 1849
 † Plicatula selandica Schnetler, 2001 
 Plicatula spondylopsis Rochebrune, 1895
 Plicatula squamosissima E. A. Smith, 1899

Synonyms
 Plicatula australis sensu P. G. Oliver, 1995, not Lamarck, 1819: synonym of Plicatula complanata Deshayes, 1863 (misapplication)
 Plicatula barbadensis d'Orbigny, 1846: synonym of Plicatula gibbosa Lamarck, 1801
 Plicatula caribbeana Weisbord, 1964: synonym of Plicatula gibbosa Lamarck, 1801
 Plicatula chinensis Mörch, 1853: synonym of Plicatula plicata (Linnaeus, 1764)
 Plicatula cristata Lamarck, 1819: synonym of Plicatula gibbosa Lamarck, 1801
 Plicatula cuneata Dunker, 1877: synonym of Plicatula regularis Philippi, 1849
 Plicatula deltoidea Dunker, 1849: synonym of Plicatula plicata (Linnaeus, 1764)
 Plicatula depressa Lamarck, 1819 sensu G. B. Sowerby II, 1847: synonym of Plicatula complanata Deshayes, 1863 (misapplication)
 Plicatula depressa Lamarck, 1819: synonym of Plicatula australis Lamarck, 1819
 Plicatula essingtonensis G. B. Sowerby II, 1873: synonym of Plicatula plicata (Linnaeus, 1764)
 † Plicatula hekiensis Nakazawa, 1955 : synonym of † Harpax hekiensis (Nakazawa, 1955)
 Plicatula imbricata Menke, 1843: synonym of Plicatula plicata (Linnaeus, 1764)
 Plicatula inezana Durham, 1950: synonym of Plicatula spondylopsis Rochebrune, 1895
 Plicatula irregularis Dunker, 1882: synonym of Plicatula horrida Dunker, 1882
 Plicatula laqueatus G. B. Sowerby II, 1842: synonym of Pecten albicans (Schröter, 1802)
 Plicatula lineata Récluz, 1851: synonym of Plicatula australis Lamarck, 1819
 Plicatula menkeana Finlay, 1927: synonym of Plicatula plicata (Linnaeus, 1764)
 Plicatula mesembrina Dall, 1925: synonym of Plicatula gibbosa Lamarck, 1801
 Plicatula multiplicata Deshayes, 1863: synonym of Plicatula australis Lamarck, 1819
 Plicatula naganumana Yokoyama, 1920: synonym of Pecten albicans (Schröter, 1802)
 Plicatula ostreivaga Rochebrune, 1895: synonym of Plicatula penicillata Carpenter, 1857
 Plicatula philippinarum G. B. Sowerby II, 1847: synonym of Plicatula plicata (Linnaeus, 1764)
 Plicatula plicatula [sic]: synonym of Plicatula plicata (Linnaeus, 1764)(misspelling)
 Plicatula ramosa Lamarck, 1819: synonym of Plicatula gibbosa Lamarck, 1801
 Plicatula ramosa Lamarck, 1819 sensu G. B. Sowerby II, 1847: synonym of Plicatula plicata (Linnaeus, 1764)(misapplication)
 Plicatula reniformis Lamarck, 1819: synonym of Plicatula gibbosa Lamarck, 1801
 Plicatula rugosa Dunker, 1877: synonym of Plicatula horrida Dunker, 1882
 Plicatula similis G. B. Sowerby II, 1842: synonym of Pecten maximus (Linnaeus, 1758)
 Plicatula simplex Gould, 1861: synonym of Plicatula regularis Philippi, 1849
 † Plicatula spinosa J. Sowerby, 1819 : synonym of † Harpax spinosus (J. Sowerby, 1819) 
 Plicatula spondyloidea Meuschen Arango & Molina, 1878: synonym of Plicatula gibbosa Lamarck, 1801
 Plicatula venezuelana Weisbord, 1964: synonym of Plicatula gibbosa Lamarck, 1801
 Plicatula vexillata Guppy, 1874: synonym of Plicatula gibbosa Lamarck, 1801

References

 Vaught, K.C.; Tucker Abbott, R.; Boss, K.J. (1989). A classification of the living Mollusca. American Malacologists: Melbourne. ISBN 0-915826-22-4. XII, 195 pp. 
 Coan, E. V.; Valentich-Scott, P. (2012). Bivalve seashells of tropical West America. Marine bivalve mollusks from Baja California to northern Peru. 2 vols, 1258 pp.

External links
 Lamarck, J. B. (1801). Système des animaux sans vertèbres, ou tableau général des classes, des ordres et des genres de ces animaux; Présentant leurs caractères essentiels et leur distribution, d'apres la considération de leurs rapports naturels et de leur organisation, et suivant l'arrangement établi dans les galeries du Muséum d'Histoire Naturelle, parmi leurs dépouilles conservées; Précédé du discours d'ouverture du Cours de Zoologie, donné dans le Muséum National d'Histoire Naturelle l'an 8 de la République. Published by the author and Deterville, Paris: viii + 432 pp.
 Simone, L. R. L. & do Amaral, V. S. (2008). Plicatulostrea, a new genus of Plicatulidae (Bivalvia: Pectinoidea) from Thailand. In: Molluscs of Eastern Thailand: Proceedings of the International Marine Bivalve Workshop, Chanthaburi, Thailand, August-September 2005, with contributions on other molluscan groups (Rüdiger Bieler, Kashane Chalermwat, Paula M. Mikkelsen, Tan Koh Siang and Fred E. Wells, eds.). The Raffles Bulletin of Zoology. suppl. 18: 127-135
  Schmidt F.C. 1818, Versuch über die beste Einrichtung zur Aufstellung: Behandlung und Aufbewahrung der verschiedenen Naturkörper und gegenṣtände der Kunst, vorzüglich der Conchylien-Sammlungen, nebst kurzer Beurtheilung der conchyliologischen Systeme und Schriften und einer tabellarischen Zusammenstellung und Vergleichung der sechs besten und neuesten conchyliologischen Systeme. Gotha, J. Perth, 252 pp.

 
Bivalve genera